Branan is a surname. Notable people with the surname include:

Brett Branan (born 1983), American soccer player
Cliff Branan (born 1961), American politician
Cory Branan (born 1974), American singer-songwriter
Dustin Branan (born 1981), American soccer player